Lahcen Sekkouri (1952 – 3 May 2022) was a Moroccan politician. A member of the Popular Movement, he served as Minister of Youth and Sports from 2015 to 2016. He died in Rabat on 3 May 2022.

References

1952 births
2022 deaths
21st-century Moroccan politicians
Government ministers of Morocco
Popular Movement (Morocco) politicians
Mohammed V University alumni
People from Fès-Meknès